"The Voice" is the 21st television play episode of the first season of the Australian anthology television series Australian Playhouse. "The Voice" was written by Kenneth Hayles and originally aired on ABC on 5 September 1966.

Plot
Max Reagan is having an affair with Cathy, wife of his partner Don Garfield. It ends and eight years later Max returns to the Garfields with a gun demanding a debt be repaid.

Cast
 Ed Devereaux as Max Reagan
 Ron Haddrick as Don Garfield
 Lyn James as Cathy

References

External links
 
 
 

1966 television plays
1966 Australian television episodes
1960s Australian television plays
Australian Playhouse (season 1) episodes